The UNAF U-21 Women's Tournament is a football (soccer) women's tournament held between nations for under 21 who are members of the UNAF association, however some other teams which are not members are invited. The first edition was held in 2019 in Algeria.

Results

Successful national teams

* hosts.

References

External links 
 unaf official website

 
UNAF competitions